Bobby Clarke (13 October 1941 – August 2008) was an English footballer, who played as an inside forward for Chester and Witton Albion.

References

Chester City F.C. players
Witton Albion F.C. players
Association football inside forwards
English Football League players
Liverpool F.C. players
1941 births
2008 deaths
Footballers from Liverpool
English footballers